David Visentin (born June 28, 1965) is a Canadian actor, realtor and commentator. He is best known for his role as a co-host of W Network's and HGTV's Love It or List It, with co-host Hilary Farr. Married to Krista Visentin since 2006.

Career 
Visentin started his career in 1987 working as an agent for Country Living Realty in Barrie, Ontario, while working alongside his father Nick Visentin. David worked on the housing market while discovering new potential homes for numerous clients for over 25 years.

Love It or List It 
Visentin auditioned for co-hosting duties for Love It or List It and was signed on by Big Coat Productions (now Big Coat Media) as one of the hosts with Farr as his competitor. Visentin's role in the show is to convince home owners to leave or "list" their home, while Farr attempts to renovate the homeowner's home at an agreed budget. Visentin does this by showing them a series of homes that could sway them to leave. In an interview with People magazine, both Visentin and Farr agreed "that their good-natured bickering is what has contributed to their series' success."

Other roles
Aside from his role on Love it or List it, Visentin has also served either as a guest or contributor on various morning news or talk show programs including The Marilyn Denis Show, Harry, The Kelly Clarkson Show and The Today Show. Visentin also joined Fox News Radio as a guest discussing the effects of the COVID 19 pandemic and the major shifts on the housing market and renovations.
He also contributes for various news services and publications such as the Canadian Press. and Time magazine.

Filmography

Television

Radio and Podcasts

Personal life 
Visentin is of Italian and Jewish descent and currently resides in Barrie, Ontario, with his wife and son.

See also 
 Hilary Farr
 Jillian Harris
 Todd Talbot 
 Drew Scott
 Jonathan Scott

References

External links 
 
 
 David Visentin at the Internet Movie Database
 

1965 births
Living people
Love It or List It
Canadian real estate agents
Canadian television hosts
Businesspeople from Toronto